George Betts (1808 – 7 October 1861) was an influential English cattle trader and butcher who played two matches of first-class cricket during the 1830s.

Betts was born in 1808 and christened on 7 November at Bearsted in Kent. He was the son of George and Anne Betts (née Goodwin). His father was a butcher and Betts followed him into the trade, owning a butchers shop at Gravesend in Kent and a farm at West Tilbury in Essex. He employed 13 workers on the farm and was considered to be a major figure in the South Essex cattle trade, the Gravesend Reporter writing that he was such a dominant figure that "he was the Tilbury Cattle Market".

Betts played club cricket for the Leeds and Bearsted team as well as for sides in Maidstone before moving to Gravesend in 1835 where he played for Gravesend Cricket Club. Five members of his family played for Leeds and Bearsted and in 1829 Betts and his brother Tom played a two-a-side match against a pair of brothers from Tovil. He made his first-class cricket debut in 1832, playing for Gentlemen against the Players at Lord's. Betts was almost certainly a late replacement, one of two who stepped in to play when members of the original Gentlemen's side did not arrive at the ground. He took at least one wicket in the match, bowling Ned Wenman, but did not score a run in either innings.

Following the match Bell's Life in London predicted that Betts would "become equal to the first-rate bowlers of the day", although as a lob bowler he was at a disadvantage as roundarm bowling was becoming dominant. In the event, he played his other first-class match for a Kent side in 1835, playing against an England side, again at Lord's. Again he failed to score in either innings and took one known wicket, this time bowling Fuller Pilch. He is known to have played one other non-first-class match for a Kent side.

Betts married Jemima Smith in 1843 at Clerkenwell. The couple had seven children. He died from trismus in October 1861 a fortnight after a shotgun accident on his farm.

Notes

References

External links

1808 births
1861 deaths
English cricketers
English cricketers of 1826 to 1863
Kent cricketers
Gentlemen cricketers